Cape Blanco State Airport  is a public airport located four miles (6.4 km) southwest of Denmark in Curry County, Oregon, United States.

The airport was constructed during World War II between 1944 and 1945, and was originally leased to the US Navy. Previous owners include Curry County and the Oregon State Highway Department.

See also
Cape Blanco, Oregon

References

External links
FAA Form 5010 for Cape Blanco State Airport

Airports in Curry County, Oregon
1945 establishments in Oregon